Olga Mural Field at Schoonover Stadium is a baseball venue located on the campus of Kent State University in Kent, Ohio, United States.  It is home to the Kent State Golden Flashes baseball team, a member of the National Collegiate Athletic Association (NCAA) in Division I and the Mid-American Conference East Division.  The field opened in 1966 and was previously known as Gene Michael Field from 1990 to 2003. The field was renamed in late 2003 and renovated in 2005 with additional upgrades made from 2006 through 2008 and again in 2013 to 2014.  It has a seating capacity of 1,148 people with a Shaw Sports Turf synthetic playing surface.

History

The field was built in 1966, replacing Memorial Field, which was located along Summit Street adjacent to Memorial Stadium. The site of Memorial Field was needed for construction of the university's new 12-story library and a science classroom building, later named Williams Hall. Memorial Field was built in 1960 and was used for games from 1961–1965. While at Memorial Field, in 1964, the team qualified for its first NCAA tournament and hosted the Minnesota Golden Gophers. Memorial Field had been built to replace the team's previous field, which opened in 1941 and was located on the opposite side of Memorial Stadium, after that area was used as a site for a new classroom building, Bowman Hall.

The first game at the new baseball field, which had no official name, was May 3, 1966 against the Ohio State Buckeyes. Initial plans called for the new field to be adjacent to a new football stadium, but the stadium would later be built at a different site further east as Dix Stadium. In 1990, the field was dedicated in honor of Kent State alumnus Gene Michael, who played and managed professionally in Major League Baseball. Later that decade, permanent bleacher seating was added behind home plate.

In November 2003, the Schoonover Foundation donated US$1.53 million to the university. The stadium was named for 1949 KSU alumnus Harold "Hal" Schoonover and his wife Julie. The initial donation helped fund a $3 million project that included new dugouts and bullpens, upgrades in seating, a drainage system and artificial FieldTurf playing surface, restroom facilities, and outfield fencing. The renovations were completed in 2005. The first game at the renovated and updated stadium was on April 1, 2005, with Kent State losing to Ohio 6–2 in front of 476 fans.

In 2006, area philanthropist Olga Mural donated $1 million towards further renovations to the field.  The playing field at Schoonover Stadium was named after her in recognition of the contribution. With Mural's donation, a new locker room and players' lounge was built and chairback seating was added to the grandstand in 2007. Additional upgrades including a new scoreboard were installed in 2008.

Facilities
The field is located on the southern edge of the Kent State campus, at the corner of Campus Center Drive and Ohio State Route 261. Adjacent to the field is the Allerton Softball Complex, a set of four intramural softball fields. Immediately north of the field is the indoor practice facility for both the baseball and softball teams, which was built in 2014. Plans call for construction of a new varsity softball field adjacent to the hitting facility as well as upgrades to the seating areas at Schoonover Stadium.

In 2005, the playing surface was changed to FieldTurf, after having previously been natural grass. The FieldTurf was replaced in 2015 by Shaw Sports Turf. After the team's appearance in the 2012 College World Series, permanent lighting was added to the stadium in time for the 2013 season opener.

See also
 List of NCAA Division I baseball venues

References

College baseball venues in the United States
Baseball venues in Ohio
1966 establishments in Ohio
Kent State Golden Flashes baseball
Sports venues completed in 1966